The 2016–17 Algerian Women's Championship is the 19th season of the Algerian Women's Championship, the Algerian national women's association football competition.
Afak Relizane won the championship for the 8th time.

Results

Groups

Group Centre-East

Group Centre-West

Play down

Play down Centre-East

Play down Centre-West

Play off

References

External links
2016–17 Algerian Women's Championship - goalzz.com

Algerian Women's Championship seasons